Cercopithecine betaherpesvirus 5 (CeHV-5) is a species of virus in the genus Cytomegalovirus, subfamily Betaherpesvirinae, family Herpesviridae, and order Herpesvirales.

African green monkeys (Chlorocebus spp.) serve as natural hosts.

References 

Betaherpesvirinae